Walberto Rolando Caicedo Caicedo (born 21 August 1992) is an Ecuadorian football forward who plays for 9 de Octubre.

Club career
He changed several clubs in home country as a loaned player of Club Sport Emelec. In 2014, he was incorporated into the first-team and became part of Emelec championship-winning squad. Lacking space in the team, he was an unused substitute on two occasions, so at the end of the season he left Emelec and moved this time abroad. Caicedo moved to Serbian side FK Metalac Gornji Milanovac. He arrived to Serbia as an anonymous foreigner who will need to fight to earn a spot in the starting line-up, however, as soon as he got a chance, he scored his first goal for Metalac on his SuperLiga debut, on away match against Čukarički, played on 19 February 2016. He became the joker substitute Metalac coach Nenad Vanić used to break opponent teams defences in the second half of the games in the following two league games. The fourth one was the one Caicedo got the chance to be a starter, and he corresponded by scoring the first goal of the game after only 14 minutes, a goal that ended up being crucial for Metalac to get a point in a 26-round 2–2 draw home against FK Rad. In summer 2017 Caicdedo returned to Ecuador and joined Guayaquil City. In March 2018 he joined Venezuelan side Deportivo Anzoátegui

Career statistics

Club

Honors
Emelec
Ecuadorian Serie A: 2014

References

External links
 Walberto Caicedo stats at utakmica.rs
 
 

1992 births
Living people
Sportspeople from Guayaquil
Ecuadorian footballers
Association football forwards
Ecuadorian expatriate footballers
Ecuadorian expatriate sportspeople in Serbia
Expatriate footballers in Serbia
FK Metalac Gornji Milanovac players
Serbian SuperLiga players
Guayaquil City F.C. footballers
Deportivo Anzoátegui players
Expatriate footballers in Venezuela